Mirny is a rural locality (a settlement) and the administrative center of Mirninskoye Rural Settlement, Gordeyevsky District, Bryansk Oblast, Russia. The population was 1,452 as of 2010. There are 15 streets.

Geography 
Mirny is located 25 km southwest of Gordeyevka (the district's administrative centre) by road. Kozhany is the nearest rural locality.

References 

Rural localities in Gordeyevsky District